Farr 45 (formerly Corel 45) is a  sailboat class designed by Bruce Farr.

References

1990s sailboat type designs
Sailboat type designs by American designers
Keelboats